Margaret Loo Agnes Kennedy (1892–1953) was an Irish Fianna Fáil politician. She was an officer in Cumann na mBan, Inghinidhe na hÉireann Branch, serving in the Jameson Distillery, Marrowbone Lane, Dublin in 1916, she was made captain in 1920, and later Commandant. Following the Rising she was detained in Kilmainham Gaol and Richmond Barracks. She took the Anti-Treaty side in the Civil War. 

She was nominated by the Taoiseach Éamon de Valera to Seanad Éireann in 1938. She was re-appointed in 1943 and 1944 and served until 1948. Kennedy was involved with Association of Old Cumann na mBan.

The daughter of Patrick Kennedy and Mary Kennedy, they lived in Dolphins Barn, South Circular Road, Dublin.

References

1892 births
1953 deaths
Cumann na mBan members
Fianna Fáil senators
Members of the 2nd Seanad
Members of the 3rd Seanad
Members of the 4th Seanad
Members of the 5th Seanad
20th-century women members of Seanad Éireann
Politicians from County Dublin
Nominated members of Seanad Éireann